Costoanachis sertulariarum is a species of sea snail, a marine gastropod mollusk in the family Columbellidae, the dove snails.

Description

Distribution
This marine species occurs off French Guiana.

References

Xenophora Taxonomy 14: 4-21

Columbellidae
Gastropods described in 1839